Roman Wäger (born February 20, 1963) is a retired Swiss professional ice hockey left winger who last played for Kloten Flyers in the National League A. He also represented the Swiss national team at several international tournaments, including the 1988 Winter Olympics.

References

External links

1963 births
Living people
Ice hockey players at the 1988 Winter Olympics
EHC Kloten players
HC Thurgau players
Olympic ice hockey players of Switzerland
Swiss ice hockey left wingers